The 1986 Masters Tournament was the 50th Masters Tournament, held April 10–13 at the Augusta National Golf Club in Augusta, Georgia.

Jack Nicklaus won his record 18th professional major with a historic one-stroke victory. He shot a final round 65 (−7), with a back nine of 30 (−6), for a total score of 279 (−9). At age 46, he became the oldest winner of the Masters and the second-oldest winner of any major championship, behind Julius Boros, who was 48 when he captured the PGA Championship in 1968 (until they were both passed by Phil Mickelson when he won the 2021 PGA Championship). The win also gave Nicklaus a record six Masters victories, the first in 1963, less than ten months after his first major win at the 1962 U.S. Open. The 23-year span of Masters victories and 24-year span of major victories are also records.  The runners-up were Tom Kite and Greg Norman, whose near-misses at the Masters are also noteworthy. The winner's share was $144,000, more than seven times what Nicklaus earned for his first Augusta win.

Course

Field
1. Masters champions
Tommy Aaron, George Archer, Seve Ballesteros (3,8,9), Gay Brewer, Billy Casper, Charles Coody, Ben Crenshaw, Raymond Floyd (4,8,11,12,13), Doug Ford, Bob Goalby, Bernhard Langer (8,11,12), Jack Nicklaus (8), Arnold Palmer, Gary Player, Craig Stadler (8,12,13), Tom Watson (2,3,8,10,12), Fuzzy Zoeller (2,9,11,12,13)

Jack Burke Jr., Ralph Guldahl, Claude Harmon, Ben Hogan, Herman Keiser, Cary Middlecoff, Byron Nelson, Henry Picard, Gene Sarazen, Sam Snead and Art Wall Jr. did not play.

The following categories only apply to Americans

2. U.S. Open champions (last five years)
Larry Nelson (4)

Andy North (9,12,13) did not play.

3. The Open champions (last five years)
Bill Rogers

4. PGA champions (last five years)
Hubert Green (10,12,13), Hal Sutton (11,12,13), Lee Trevino (8,10)

5. 1985 U.S. Amateur semi-finalists
Chip Drury (a), Peter Persons (a), Sam Randolph (6,7,8,a)

6. Previous two U.S. Amateur and Amateur champions
Scott Verplank (7,11,a)

7. Members of the 1985 U.S. Walker Cup team
Bob Lewis (a), Jay Sigel (a), Michael Podolak (a), Randy Sonnier (a)

Clark Burroughs, Jerry Haas, Davis Love III, and Duffy Waldorf forfeited their exemptions by turning professional.

8. Top 24 players and ties from the 1985 Masters Tournament
Fred Couples (10), Jay Haas (9), Gary Hallberg, Billy Kratzert, Gary Koch, Wayne Levi (11,12), Bruce Lietzke, John Mahaffey (11,12), Mark McCumber, Mark O'Meara (9,12,13), Tim Simpson (11), Curtis Strange (11,12,13), Jim Thorpe (11,12), Lanny Wadkins (9,11,12,13)

9. Top 16 players and ties from the 1985 U.S. Open
Andy Bean (10,11), Rick Fehr, Hale Irwin (11), Tom Kite (11,12,13), Johnny Miller, Corey Pavin (11,12), Don Pooley, Jack Renner (12), Tony Sills, Scott Simpson, Joey Sindelar (11,12), Payne Stewart (12)

10. Top eight players and ties from 1985 PGA Championship
Buddy Gardner

11. Winners of PGA Tour events since the previous Masters
Phil Blackmar (12), George Burns (12), Bob Eastwood, Danny Edwards (12), Dan Forsman, Bill Glasson (12), Ken Green, Donnie Hammond, Kenny Knox, Roger Maltbie (12), Calvin Peete (12,13), Doug Tewell, Bob Tway, Mark Wiebe

12. Top 30 players from the 1985 PGA Tour money list
Peter Jacobsen (13), Larry Mize, Mac O'Grady, Dan Pohl, Larry Rinker

13. Members of the U.S. 1985 Ryder Cup team

14. Foreign invitations
Isao Aoki (8), Dave Barr (9), Chen Tze-chung (9), Chen Tze-ming (10), David Graham (2,8), Jack Kay Jr. (5,a), Sandy Lyle (3,11), Garth McGimpsey (6,a), Tsuneyuki Nakajima, Greg Norman (9), Nick Price (10), Denis Watson (9)

Numbers in brackets indicate categories that the player would have qualified under had they been American.

Round summaries

First round
Thursday, April 10, 1986

Second round
Friday, April 11, 1986

Third round
Saturday, April 12, 1986

Final round
Sunday, April 13, 1986

Summary
In one of the most memorable and exciting final rounds in Masters history, five different players held at least a share of the lead in the final round. Seve Ballesteros gained a share of the lead on the front 9 helped by a hole-out eagle at 8. Jack Nicklaus played his first eight holes in even par, but stormed into contention with birdies at 9, 10 and 11. However, Nicklaus bogeyed the 12th to fall three behind the leaders. Greg Norman, tied for the lead at −7 as he made the turn, double-bogeyed the 10th hole to give Ballesteros the outright lead by one shot over Tom Kite. Ballesteros hit his second shot at 13 to within six feet. After Kite lagged up his own eagle putt on 13, Ballesteros holed his putt for his second eagle of the day and a three shot lead over Kite. Kite then holed his birdie putt to cut the lead back to two.

After a par at 14, Nicklaus began his legendary charge at 15. Nicklaus then hit his tee shot on 16 to within 3 feet and after holing his birdie putt he was within one shot of Ballesteros who was playing the 15th hole. Ballesteros, who was in prime position to go for the green in two, pull hooked his approach into the water. After failing to get up and down, Ballesteros bogeyed the hole, giving Nicklaus a share of the lead. Kite made birdie at 15 to enter into a three-way tie with Ballesteros and Nicklaus. After long deliberation, he holed his putt on 17 for sole possession of the lead for the first time in the tournament. He two-putted for par on 18 to post −9 and a one shot lead.	

Ballesteros three-putted the 17th to fall out of contention, but Kite had 12 feet for birdie on 18 to tie Nicklaus. Kite barely missed his putt on the high side to miss a playoff by one shot. Norman, left for dead after his double-bogey on 10, birdied 14, 15 and 16 to pull within one shot of the lead. After hooking his drive way left on 17, Norman made an incredible shot between two pines to within eight feet. Norman buried the birdie putt, his fourth straight, to tie for the lead. Norman then hit a perfect drive on 18, needing birdie for his first major championship. However, Norman pushed his approach shot into the gallery and subsequently missed his  par putt to finish one stroke behind. Nicklaus had stormed back, shooting 30 on the back nine, to win his sixth Masters title and became the oldest Masters champion at age 46.

Both Ballesteros and Norman have stated the most regretful shots of their careers were during the final round of the 1986 Masters. For Ballesteros it was his approach shot to the 15th hole and for Norman his approach shot to the 18th.

Final leaderboard

Sources:

Scorecard

Cumulative tournament scores, relative to par
{|class="wikitable" span = 50 style="font-size:85%;
|-
|style="background: Red;" width=10|
|Eagle
|style="background: Pink;" width=10|
|Birdie
|style="background: PaleGreen;" width=10|
|Bogey
|style="background: Green;" width=10|
|Double bogey
|}
Source:

Tournament notes
Jack Nicklaus increased his record for most Masters wins to six, and most major championship wins to 18.
Nicklaus tied the course record with a 30 on the second nine in the final round, while Nick Price shot a 30 on the second nine a day earlier (tied with four others). Nicklaus' 30 included a bogey, at the par-3 12th. The record for the back nine is now 29, set in the fourth round in 1992 by Mark Calcavecchia, and tied by David Toms in the fourth round in 1998.
Gary Koch won the Par 3 contest with a score of 23 (−4); he tied for 16th at 286 (−2)
Nick Price set a course record with his third-round 63 (−9), later tied by Greg Norman in the first round in 1996.
The previous course record of 64 was set by Lloyd Mangrum in 1940.
Price set a single-round record at Augusta with ten birdies in round 3; the record is now eleven birdies (Anthony Kim, second round, 2009).
Sam Randolph was low amateur for the second consecutive year.

Quotes
"Yes sir! The battle is joined. My goodness. There is life in the old Bear yet." – Ben Wright's (CBS Sports) call as Nicklaus sank his eagle putt on the 15th hole to pull within two shots of the lead.
"And there's no doubt about it, the Bear has come out of hibernation." – Jim Nantz's (CBS Sports) call as Nicklaus sank his 3-foot birdie putt on the 16th hole to pull within one shot of the lead.
"Oh he's pulled it! Oh he has pull hooked that! That's destined for the water! And the foreign invasion is reeling under the Bear's attack!" – Ben Wright's call as Ballesteros pulled his second shot into the water at 15.
"Maybe... Yes sir!" – Verne Lundquist's (CBS Sports) call as Nicklaus made his  birdie putt on the 17th hole to take sole possession of the lead for the first time in the tournament.

References

External links
Masters.com – Past winners and results
Augusta.com – 1986 Masters leaderboard and scorecards
You Tube.com – video – 1986 Masters: highlights of final holes from CBS Sports broadcast

1986
1986 in golf
1986 in American sports
1986 in sports in Georgia (U.S. state)
April 1986 sports events in the United States